There have been several referendums in the history of Poland.

1920 and 1921
There were no country-wide referendums in the Second Polish Republic, but there were two local referendums on border issues between Poland and Germany:
 11 July 1920 – Referendum on Warmia, Mazury and 
 20 March 1921 – Referendum on Upper Silesia

1946 and 1987
There were two referendums in the People's Republic of Poland:
 30 June 1946 – People's referendum (also known as the 3xTAK, 3 times YES referendum)
 29 November 1987 – Referendum on political and economic reforms

Since 1989
There have been four referendums in post-Communist Poland:
 18 February 1996: two referendums:
 Referendum on enfranchisement of citizens (Referendum w sprawie powszechnego uwłaszczenia obywateli)
 Referendum with four questions on privatised assets (Referendum o niektórych kierunkach wykorzystania majątku państwowego)
 25 May 1997 – Referendum on the Constitution (Referendum konstytucyjne)
 7–8 June 2003 – Referendum on joining the EU (Referendum akcesyjne or Referendum europejskie)
 6 September 2015 – Referendum with three questions on Sejm representation, political party funding, and tax law dispute resolution:
 Introducing single-member constituencies for Sejm elections, on maintaining state financing of political parties and introducing a presumption in favour of the taxpayer in disputes over the tax law.

A referendum on the proposed EU Constitution was planned in 2005, but was abandoned after the rejection of the Constitution by French voters.